Emo may refer to the following people
Given name
Emo of Friesland (c. 1175–1237), Frisian scholar
 Emo de Medeiros (born 1979), French/Beninese artist
 Emo Philips (born 1956), American stand-up comedian
Emo Welzl (born 1958), Austrian computer scientist

Surname
 Angelo Emo (1731–1792), Admiral of the Republic of Venice
E. W. Emo (1898–1975), Austrian film director
Maria Emo, Austrian stage, film and television actress

English masculine given names
German-language surnames